Lumbala is a surname. Notable people with the surname include:

Roger Lumbala (born 1958), Congolese politician
Rolly Lumbala (born 1986), Canadian football player
Steven Lumbala (born 1991),  Canadian football player

Surnames of African origin